William Archibald may refer to:
William Archibald (politician) (1852–1926), English-born Australian politician
William Munroe Archibald (1876–1949), Canadian aviator
William Archibald (playwright) (1917–1970), Trinidad and Tobago-born American playwright and screenwriter

See also